This article is a list of tornadoes that had at least one confirmed satellite tornado. A satellite tornado is one that revolves around a larger, primary tornado and interacts with the same mesocyclone. Satellite tornadoes occur apart from the primary tornado and are not considered subvortices; the primary and satellite are considered to be separate tornadoes.

List

Potential satellite tornadoes list 
This is a list of tornadoes that potentially had satellite tornadoes, but never had any confirmed.

See also
 List of tornadoes and tornado outbreaks
 List of F5 and EF5 tornadoes
 List of F4 and EF4 tornadoes
 List of F4 and EF4 tornadoes (2010–2019)
 List of F4 and EF4 tornadoes (2020–present)

Notes

References

Satellite tornadoes
Tornado-related lists